Aerococcus viridans is a member of the bacterial genus Aerococcus. It is a causative agent of gaffkaemia, a disease of lobsters, and is used as a commercial source for lactate oxidase.

References

External links 

Type strain of Aerococcus viridans at BacDive -  the Bacterial Diversity Metadatabase

Lactobacillales